Christopher Martin Nigel Jones (born 19 November 1945 in Altrincham, Cheshire, England) is an English former footballer.

Career
Jones started his professional career with Manchester City in May 1964. Though he played regularly in the reserves, finishing top scorer for three seasons running, he did not make his league debut until December 1966, when he deputised for Mike Summerbee in a match against Nottingham Forest. A week later he scored his first senior goal, against West Bromwich Albion. The following season, he made two appearances in Manchester City's 1967–68 League Championship winning side, though his contribution was insufficient to gain a winners' medal. He later had a career with York City scoring 33 goals in 95 games. 

Despite shake ups to Radio York's York City commentary team for the 2014/5 season, he retains his long running role as match commentator to this date.
Jones has released an autobiography, "The Tale of Two Great Cities", detailing his time with both York City and Manchester City.

Notes

1945 births
Living people
People from Altrincham
English footballers
Association football forwards
English Football League players
Manchester City F.C. players
Swindon Town F.C. players
Oldham Athletic A.F.C. players
Walsall F.C. players
York City F.C. players
Huddersfield Town A.F.C. players
Doncaster Rovers F.C. players
Darlington F.C. players
Rochdale A.F.C. players
Footballers from Greater Manchester
English autobiographers